Joint Chiefs of Staff may refer to:
 Joint Chiefs of Staff of the United States
 Joint Chiefs of Staff (Saudi Arabia)
 Joint Chiefs of Staff (South Korea)
 Joint Chiefs of Staff (Iran)
 Board of Joint Chiefs of Staff, Spain
 Joint Chiefs of Staff Committee, Pakistan

See also
Chiefs of Staff (disambiguation)
Chairman of the Joint Chiefs of Staff (disambiguation)
Chief of the Defence Staff (disambiguation)